Tomal is a Polish-language surname. It is a patronymic surname derived from the given name Tomasz. Notable people with this surname include:

George Tomal, American dancer, a founder of the New Jersey Ballet
Marsha Tomal, American musician of Daughters of Eve
 (1921–1984), Polish agrarian, politician and statesman

See also
Tomala (surname)

References

Polish-language surnames
Patronymic surnames